Harinder Pal Singh Chandumajra (born 28 February 1980) is an Indian politician and a member of SAD. In 2017, he was elected as the member of the Punjab Legislative Assembly from Sanour.

Member of Legislative Assembly
Pal Singh Chandumajra represented the Sanour between 2017-2022. He won the Sanour Assembly constituency on an SAD ticket, he defeated the member of the Punjab Legislative Assembly Harinder Pal Singh Mann of the INC by over 4870 votes.

In the 2022 Punjab Legislative Assembly election Harmeet Singh Pathanmajra defeated Chandumajra by a large margin of 49,122 votes.

Political party
Pal Singh Chandumajra is from the SAD.

References

Living people
Indian politicians
1980 births
Punjab, India MLAs 2017–2022